Martha Susan McEntire-Eaton (formerly Luchsinger; born November 8, 1957) is an American contemporary Christian music singer. She is the younger sister of Reba, Alice, and  Pake. She used her married name of Susie Luchsinger on her solo albums until her divorce in 2008.

Early life

Martha Susan McEntire was born on November 8, 1957, to Clark Vincent McEntire (1927–2014), and Jacqueline "Jackie" McEntire (née Smith; 1926–2020) in Chockie, Oklahoma, and was raised there. Eaton attended Oklahoma State University.

Career
She toured with sister Reba McEntire in the 1980s, in addition to singing on the albums Heart to Heart (1981) and Unlimited (1982).
 
In 1993, she released her debut solo record, scoring several hits on Christian country radio. The album hit #39 on the U.S. Billboard Top Contemporary Christian Albums chart in 1994. Several further solo albums followed in the 1990s and 2000s.
McEntire-Eaton was inducted into the Christian Music Hall of Fame on November 5, 2011. She was also inducted into the Oklahoma Music Hall of Fame in December 2018.

Personal life

McEntire married rodeo cowboy Paul Luchsinger (died May 12, 2015) on November 27, 1981, whom she divorced on May 19, 2008. The couple had three children. On December 12, 2009, she remarried, to American theologian, climber and public speaker Mark Eaton, of Seattle, Washington. She holds many awards in the field of Positive Country and as co-host of the Cowboy Church TV show. The Eatons reside in Stringtown, Oklahoma.

Discography

Albums

Singles

External links
Susie on YouTube
 Susie's CMT Artist Page

References

1957 births
Living people
American performers of Christian music
American women country singers
People from Atoka County, Oklahoma
Singers from Oklahoma
Country musicians from Oklahoma
21st-century American women